The mayor of Rome is an elected politician who, along with the Rome City Council of 48 members, is accountable for the strategic government of Rome. As Rome is a comune speciale since 2009, the office is different from the offices of the other Italian cities. The title is the equivalent of Lord Mayor in the meaning of an actual executive leader.

Overview

According to the City of Rome Statutes, the Mayor of Rome is a member of Rome's City Council.
The Mayor is elected by the population of Rome. Citizens elect also the members of the City Council, which also controls the mayor's policy guidelines and is able to enforce the mayor's resignation by a motion of no confidence. The mayor is entitled to appoint and release the members of their government, which are twelve according to the Italian Constitution.

The seat of the City Council is the city hall Palazzo Senatorio on the Capitoline Hill.

History
When the City of Rome was founded, it was initially ruled by Kings. After the last King was overthrown, it would be ruled by Consuls who were elected by the Assembly of the Centuries. The Assembly of the Centuries was an extremely oligarchic voting system, with voters organized into blocks based on wealth, and each block having but one vote to elect the Consuls. 

There were two Consuls at a time, known as the Consul Priori and the Consul Posteriori, and they served a 1-year term. Technically the Consul Priori was in charge of the city as well as the larger Roman Republic, and the Consul Posteriori was his second-in-command, but in practice both Consuls shared power except in times of national emergency. (Said emergencies would lead to either Senatus Consultum Ultimum, or failing that the true last resort was a Dictatorship, to be held by the Consul Priori.) 

Roman Emperors were essentially Mayors of Rome ex officio, although the Consuls continued to exist in a largely ceremonial role. The Assembly of the Centuries was abolished, and the power to elect Consuls was transferred to the Senate alone. Once the Western Roman Empire ended, Consuls retook charge of the city, even as Kings once again ruled larger territories that included Rome. By this time there were no longer two Consuls in Rome, but one, the position of Consul Posteriori having been ceded to the younger Eastern Roman Empire. 

In 534, a man named Decius Paulinus served as the very last Consul of Rome. (The last Consul was Byzantine Emperor Leo VI, but he did not rule from Rome.) The Senate survived as a city council of sorts, until it passed its final acts and voted to disband in 603. All the while, law and order were largely kept by various foreign occupiers (and their appointed city-governors). 

In 756, the Donation of Pepin made Rome the capital of a newly formed Federation of the Papal States. After this, the city would be directly ruled by the same Popes who also ruled the much larger Papal States territory. During the final third or so of its existence, the Papal States also had a Governor of Rome, appointed by the Pope to rule the city in his name, allowing the Pope himself to focus on national and ecclesial matters. 

Having been the capital of the Papal States, Rome did not receive its modern Mayor until 1870, when it became the capital of the Kingdom of Italy. The new Mayor served as a member of the city council, and he was appointed every three years by the King of Italy. Then since 1889 the Mayor was elected every four years by the City Council. However, the fascist dictatorship abolished mayors and City councils in 1926, replacing them with a single authoritarian Rector (Podestà) chosen by the National Fascist Party. The rector of Rome was called "Governatore" (Governor).

After World War II, the Mayor was chosen by the City Council. In 1993, the election of the Mayor was transferred from the City Council to direct election by the people. In 2001, the schedule of such elections was changed from every 4 years to every 5 years.

List of Mayors of Rome

Papal States (1558–1870)
From 1558 to 1870, the Papal States created the office of Governatore (Governor), also called Vice Camerlengo, chosen by the Pope.

 1558–1560 – Virgilio Rosario
 1560–1588 – Giacomo Savelli
 1588–1603 – Girolamo Rusticucci
 1603–1605 – Camillo Borghese (future Pope Paul V)
 1605–1610 – Girolamo Pamphili
 1610–1629 – Giovanni Garzia Millini
 1629–1671 – Marzio Ginetti
 Acting 1671 – Paluzzo Paluzzi Altieri degli Albertoni
 1671–1714 – Gaspare Carpegna
 1714–1721 – Giovanni Domenico Paracciani
 1721–1726 – Fabrizio Paolucci
 1726–1732 – Prospero Marefoschi
 1732–1759 – Giovanni Antonio Guadagni
 1759–1762 – Antonio Maria Erba Odescalchi
 1762–1793 – Marcantonio Colonna
 1793–1795 – Andrea Corsini
 1795–1810 – Giulio Maria della Somaglia
 1810–1813 – Antonio Despuig y Dameto
 1813–1820 – Lorenzo Litta
 1820–1823 – Annibale Sermattei della Genga (future Pope Leo XII)
 Acting 1823–1824 – Giuseppe della Porta Rodiani
 1824–1834 – Placido Zurla
 1834–1838 – Carlo Odescalchi
 1838–1841 – Giuseppe della Porta Rodiani
 1841–1870 – Costantino Patrizi Naro

Kingdom of Italy (1870–1946)
From 1870, when Rome was annexed, the Kingdom of Italy created the office of the Mayor of Rome (Sindaco di Roma), chosen by the City council. In 1926, the Fascist dictatorship abolished mayors and City councils, replacing them with a single authoritarian Governatore (Governor) chosen by the National Fascist Party.

Republic of Italy (1946–present)

City Council election (1946–1993)
From 1946 to 1993, the Mayor of Rome was chosen by the City Council.

Notes

Direct election (since 1993)
Since 1993, under provisions of new local administration law, the Mayor of Rome is chosen by direct election, originally every four, and since 2001 every five years.

Notes

Timeline

Mayors

Political coalition

By time in office

Election

Deputy Mayor
The office of the Deputy Mayor of Rome was officially created in 1993 with the adoption of the new local administration law. The Deputy Mayor is nominated and eventually dismissed by the Mayor. 

Notes

References

Rome
History of Rome
 
Mayors
Rome-related lists